Econometric Institute (Dutch Econometrisch Instituut) at the Erasmus University Rotterdam is a leading research institute in the fields of econometrics and management science in the Netherlands. The Institute offers advanced education in econometrics. It was founded in 1956 by Henri Theil in cooperation with Jan Tinbergen.

History

Foundation 
The first proposal for a special institute in quantitative economics at the Netherlands School of Economics in Rotterdam was made by Henri Theil in 1953 with support of Jan Tinbergen, while working at the Central Planning Bureau. The senate of the school added the requirement that it "would not confine itself to economic applications, but would also give attention to business problems, which implied that operations research had to be included in the program."

In the year 1955–56 Theil was Visiting Professor at the University of Chicago, where he made a similar proposal again with support of Jan Tinbergen. This proposal was eventually accepted both in Chicago and in Rotterdam, and the Econometric Institute started September 1956 in Chicago and later in Rotterdam.

The Econometric Institute was the first research institute in the field of econometrics in the world, and started with a research staff of 6. Henri Theil became its first director, and headed the institute until 1966.

Development 
In the early years the Institute developed a full academic program in Econometrics. The program originally focussed on "national and international macroeconomic policy; the required computing power to estimate econometric models was expensive and scarcely available, so that econometrics was almost exclusively applied in public (statistical) agencies." This evolved over the years. In this time many leading econometricians were guest at the Institute.

New millennium 
In the new Millennium the Econometric Institute had "dismissed a strong emphasis on mathematics and statistics as research areas, and it embraced areas as finance, marketing and economics in general." In 2005 the Econometric Institute served some 300 students at the BSc and MSc level, and 28 PhD students with a staff of 35.

Directors 
Directors since 1956

 1956 - 1956 : Jan Tinbergen
 1956 - 1966 : Henri Theil
 1966 - 1971 : Jan Sandee
 1971 - 1982 : Willem Somermeyer 
 1982 - 1987 : Alexander Rinnooy Kan (co-director)
 1982 - 1992 : Teun Kloek (co-director)
 1987 - 1992 : Harm Bart (co-director)
 1992 - 1998 : Ton Vorst
 1998 - 2003 : Herman K. van Dijk
 2004 - 2006 : Philip Hans Franses
 2006 – 2014 : Albert Wagelmans
 2014 – 2020: Patrick Groenen
 2020 - present: Dennis Fok

See also 
 Erasmus Research Institute of Management
 Tinbergen Institute
 TRAIL Research School

References

External links 
 Department of Econometrics: Econometric Institute at Erasmus University Rotterdam

Erasmus University Rotterdam
Economic research institutes
Research institutes in the Netherlands